Voprosy I Otvety (Russian: Вопросы и ответы, English: Questions And Answers) is a game show television channel which offers its viewers an opportunity to "join the game" when it is convenient. Its programs consist of short episodes.

The channel belongs to the broadcaster Television Company Stream, one of the largest broadcasting companies in Russia. The distribution channel network "STREAM" has about 1,400 operators of cable, satellite, and IPTV-networks broadcast in all nine federal subjects of Russia, as well as in the CIS and Europe. It is an analogue of the British television channel Challenge and the American channel GSN.

By the end of 2013, the number of "STREAM" TV viewers, including "Voprosy I Otvety", exceeded 27 million people.

On 27 January 2011, the Director-General, Konstantin Zakharov, who previously held senior positions at other channels, was replaced by Kirill Legat. The post of Deputy Director-General was taken by Svetlana Sorokina, who also served as the CFO. The producer of the channel is Viktor Khomich, who has many years of experience as an editor, director, and presenter of several radio programs. The manager of the distribution service is Michel Tonoyan.

List of game shows 
 A Question of Genius
 Agentstvo Odinokikh Serdets
 Algorithm
 All Star Mr & Mrs
 Bankomat. Wyścig z czasem (Polish version of The Cash Machine)
 Brain Ring (Russian and Belarusian versions)
 Breakaway
 Britain's Brainiest
 Cash Cab
 Cash Trapped
 Chto? Gde? Kogda? (Russian version of "What? Where? When?")
 Detective Show
 Dva Royalya (Russian version of "The Lyrics Board")
 Ekstremalnyye Situatsii
 El Grand Prix del verano (including Grand Prix. Express)
 Fifteen to One
 Fort Boyard
 Instant Cash
 Koleso Istorii
 Le Tricheur (French version of "Only One Knows")
 Meshabet Ahkesef (Israeli version of "The Money Pump")
 Poymi Menya (Russian version of "Hot Streak")
 Proshche Prostogo (Russian version of "Hollywood Squares")
 Race to Escape
 Richard Hammond's Blast Lab
 Russian Roulette
 Schastlivy Sluchay
 Sokrovishche Natsii
 Sto K Odnomu (Russian version of "Family Feud")
 Svoya Igra (Russian version of "Jeopardy!")
 The Chair (British and New Zealand versions)
 The Chase (UK)
 The Chase (US)
 The Cube
 The Edge
 The Pyramid Game
 Reflex
 Ugaday Melodiyu (Russian version of "Name That Tune")
 Umnitsy I Umniki
 Ustami Mladentsa (Russian version of "Child's Play")
 Who Wants to Be a Millionaire?
 Zolotaya Likhoradka

Notes

External links 
 Website
 Website (old)

Mass media companies of Russia
Companies based in Moscow
Russian-language television stations in Russia
Publicly funded broadcasters
State media
Game shows
Television channels and stations established in 2009